Leheria (or leheriya) is a traditional style of tie dye practiced in Rajasthan, India that results in brightly colored cloth with distinctive patterns.  The technique gets its name from the Rajasthani word for wave because the dyeing technique is often used to produce complex wave patterns.

Writing about textile crafts for The Hindu, Mita Kapur asserts: "The famous leheriya (zigzag pattern of irregular colour stripes) is a visual invocation of the flow of water at the same time painstakingly showing the depths of indigo after multiple mud-resistant and dyeing processes. No small wonder that the blues in leheriya attract the eyes instinctively."

Technique 
Leheria dyeing is done on thin cotton or silk cloth, usually in lengths appropriate for dupatta, turbans or saris. According to World Textiles: A Visual Guide to Traditional Techniques, the fabric is "rolled diagonally from one corner to the opposite selvedge, and then tied at the required intervals and dyed".  Wave patterns result from fanlike folds made before dyeing. Traditional leheria employs natural dyes and multiple washes and uses indigo or alizarin during the final stage of preparation.

Mothara 
An additional dyeing using the leheria technique produces mothara.  In the making of mothara, the original resists are removed and the fabric is re-rolled and tied along the opposite diagonal.  This results in a checkered pattern with small undyed areas occurring at regular intervals.  The undyed areas are about the size of a lentil, hence the name mothara (moth means lentil in Hindi).

Use 
Leheria turbans were a standard part of male business attire in Rajasthan during the nineteenth and early twentieth centuries.  Leheria is still produced in Jodhpur, Jaipur, Udaipur, and Nathdwara.  It is offered for sale with most of its resist ties still in place as proof of authenticity, with a small portion of fabric unrolled to display its pattern.

Leheria occasionally appears in fashion collections, such as Designer Malini Ramani's beach collection in the Spring 2006 Delhi fashion show.

Footnotes

References

Textile arts of India
Rajasthani arts